This is a list of the women's national basketball teams in the world.

Active teams
The International Basketball Federation, or FIBA recognizes 213 national teams divided into 5 zones, each roughly corresponding to a continent (North America and South America are grouped under the Americas.)

The newest national team is Montenegro which was recognized in 2006.

There are more FIBA-recognized teams than FIFA-recognized teams (209).

FIBA Africa

FIBA Africa, which has 53 national teams, is divided into 7 zones.

Zone 1

Zone 2

Zone 3

Zone 4

Zone 5

Zone 6

Zone 7

FIBA Americas

FIBA Americas (formerly the Pan-American Basketball Confederation), which controls North America, Central America, the Caribbean, and South America, has 44 national teams, divided into three areas. The Central American and Caribbean Confederations of Basketball (CONCECABA) is further divided into the Central America and Caribbean zone.

CONCECABA

Caribbean

Central America

North America

South America

FIBA Asia

FIBA Asia (formerly the Asian Basketball Confederation) is divided into 5 zones.

East Asia

Gulf

Middle Asia

SEABA

WABA

FIBA Europe
FIBA Europe has 52 member nations under it.

 
 
 
 
 
 
 
 
 
 
 
 
 
 
 
 
 
 
 
 
 
 
 
 
 
 
 
 
 
 
 
 
 
 
 
 
 
 
 
 
 
 
 
 
 
 
 
 
 
 
 
 
 
 
, a combined team of England, Scotland, Wales and Northern Ireland will play at the 2012 Olympics and at the EuroBasket Women 2011, 2013 and 2015.
 is not a member of FIBA, but there are hers national federation, the national teams, leagues, etc.

FIBA Oceania
FIBA Oceania has 21 member nations under it.

Non-FIBA members

Defunct teams

FIBA country codes
FIBA uses IOC country codes for most countries which are IOC members. For non-IOC members and exceptions, FIBA uses the following codes:
: ENG
: GIB
: MIS (IOC: MHL)
: MAT
: CAL
: NIS
: SAI
: SCO
: TAH
: TCI
: WAL

See also

References